Tselina or virgin lands is an umbrella term for underdeveloped, scarcely populated, high-fertility lands often covered with the chernozem soil. The lands were mostly located in the steppes of the Volga region, Northern Kazakhstan and Southern Siberia.

The term became widely used in the late 1950s and early 1960s in the Soviet Union during the Virgin Lands campaign - a state development and resettlement campaign to turn the lands into a major agriculture producing region.

See also 

Chernozem
Tselinograd

References 

Land tenure
Agronomy
Agriculture in the Soviet Union
History of agriculture